Igor Praporshchikov (born 7 February 1976) is an Australian wrestler. He competed in the men's freestyle 85 kg at the 2000 Summer Olympics.

References

External links
 

1976 births
Living people
Australian male sport wrestlers
Olympic wrestlers of Australia
Wrestlers at the 2000 Summer Olympics
Sportspeople from Odesa